Pavlovsky is a rural locality (a khutor) in Nekhayevskoye Rural Settlement, Nekhayevsky District, Volgograd Oblast, Russia. The population was 294 as of 2010. There are 2 streets.

Geography 
Pavlovsky is located on the right bank of the Tishanka River, 5 km southeast of Nekhayevskaya (the district's administrative centre) by road. Nekhayevskaya is the nearest rural locality.

References 

Rural localities in Nekhayevsky District